Kannayariamudayar Temple, Thirukarayil (also called Thirukolili or Thirukuvlai or Brahmapureeswarar temple)  is a Hindu temple dedicated to Shiva located in Thirukkuvalai in Nagapattinam district of Tamil Nadu, India. Constructed in the Dravidian style of architecture, the temple is believed to have been built during the Cholas period in the 9th century. Shiva is worshipped as Brahmapureeswarar and his consort Parvathi as Meenkashi Ambal.

The presiding deity is revered in the 7th century Tamil Saiva canonical work, the Tevaram, written by Tamil saint poets known as the Nayanmars and classified as Paadal Petra Sthalam. A granite wall surrounds the temple, enclosing all its shrines. The temple has a five-tiered Rajagopuram, the gateway tower. 

The temple is open from 6am - 1 pm and 4-8:30 pm on all days. Six daily rituals and three yearly festivals are held at the temple, of which the Nel attic seelum vizha being some of the prominent festivals celebrated. The temple is maintained and administered by the Hindu Religious and Endowment Board of the Government of Tamil Nadu.

Legend
As per Hindu legend, Bheema, one of the five Pandavas propitiated himself off the sin of killing Bakasura by worshipping Shiva at the temple. Another legend is that once, while Vishnu and Brahma contested for superiority, Shiva appeared as a flame, and challenged them to find his source. Brahma took the form of a swan, and flew to the sky to see the top of the flame, while Vishnu became the boar Varaha, and sought its base. The scene is called lingothbava, and is represented in the western wall at the sanctum of most Shiva temples. Neither Brahma nor Vishnu could find the source, and while Vishnu conceded his defeat, Brahma lied and said he had found the pinnacle. In punishment, Shiva ordained that Brahma would never have temples on earth in his worship. To relieve himself off the curse, Brahma made a linga  of sand here and worshipped Shiva here. The presiding deity thus came to be known as Brahmapureeswar, the one who was worshipped by Shiva. Sundarar, the famous Saivite saint is believed to have worshipped Shiva in this place to seek help for transporting paddy grains to Tiruvarur.

Architecture
The temple is believed to have been built during the Medieval Chola period with subsequent addition during Pandyas. The temple has a five-tiered rajagopuram, the entrance tower. There are four bodies of water associated with the temple in all four directions. Brahma Tirtha is located opposite to the temple, Agasthya Tirtha to the west, Vinayaga Tirtha in the north and Sakthi theertha, a small well near the Ambal shrine. The presiding deity in the form of Linga (an iconic form of Shiva) is housed in the central shrine, which is located axial to the gateway tower. The sanctum is preceded by an ardhamandapa and a mukhamandapa, rectangular halls before the sanctum. There is a small shrine of Agastya Linga and Sivaloka Vinayaga inside the premises. Following the legend of Navagrahas worshipping the presiding deity, the planetary deities are located in a single line facing the sanctum. There are images of Sundarar and Paravai Nachiyar in the temple.

Religious importance
The Thyagarajar Temple at Tiruvarur is famous for the ajapa thanam(dance without chanting), that is executed by the deity itself.  According to legend, a Chola king named Mucukunta obtained a boon from Indra(a celestial deity) and wished to receive an image of Thyagaraja Swamy(presiding deity, Shiva in the temple) reposing on the chest of reclining Lord Vishnu.  Indra tried to misguide the king and had six other images made, but the king chose the right image at Tiruvarur.  The other six images were installed in Thiruvaimur, Nagapattinam, Tirukarayil, Tirukolili (Thirukuvalai), Thirunallaru and Tirumaraikadu.  All the seven places are villages situated in the river Cauvery delta. All seven Thyagaraja images are said to dance when taken in procession(it is the bearers of the processional deity who actually dance). The temples with dance styles are regarded as Saptha Vidangam (seven dance moves) and the related temples are as under:

Worship practices 
The temple priests perform the puja (rituals) during festivals and on a daily basis. Like other Shiva temples of Tamil Nadu, the priests belong to the Shaiva community, a Brahmin sub-caste. The temple rituals are performed four times a day; Ushathkalam at 6:30 a.m., Kalasanthi at 8:00 a.m., Uchikalam at 12:00 a.m., Sayarakshai at 5:00 p.m., and Ardha Jamam at 8:00 p.m. Each ritual comprises four steps: abhisheka (sacred bath), alangaram (decoration), naivethanam (food offering) and deepa aradanai (waving of lamps) for both Brahmapureeswarar and Meenakshi Ambal. The worship is held amidst music with nagaswaram (pipe instrument) and tavil (percussion instrument), religious instructions in the Vedas (sacred texts) read by priests and prostration by worshipers in front of the temple mast. Mahashivaratri during February - March and Thiruvadihari during December are the major festivals celebrated in the temple. Nel attic seelum vizha and Margazhi Thiruvathirai are the major festivals in the temple. Following the legend of nine planetary deities, people with ailments due to the ill effects of nine planets offer worship here.

References

External links

Padal Petra Stalam
Shiva temples in Nagapattinam district